Bardolph is a village in McDonough County, Illinois, United States. The population was 210 at the 2020 census, down from 251 in 2010.

Geography
Bardolph is located in eastern McDonough County at  (40.495331, -90.563344).

 
The principal street is Broadway, which runs parallel to the Burlington Northern Railroad. Melvin Kerr Tree Farm is on the west side of town.

Demographics

As of the census of 2000, there were 253 people, 87 households, and 64 families residing in the village. The racial makeup of the village was 100.00% White.

There were 87 households, out of which 47.1% had children under the age of 18 living with them, 52.9% were married couples living together, 18.4% had a female householder with no husband present, and 25.3% were non-families. 23.0% of all households were made up of individuals, and 10.3% had someone living alone who was 65 years of age or older. The average household size was 2.91 and the average family size was 3.34.

In the village, the population was spread out, with 34.4% under the age of 18, 12.6% from 18 to 24, 28.5% from 25 to 44, 16.6% from 45 to 64, and 7.9% who were 65 years of age or older. The median age was 27 years. For every 100 females, there were 83.3 males. For every 100 females age 18 and over, there were 93.0 males.

The median income for a household in the village was $25,833, and the median income for a family was $30,208. Males had a median income of $29,167 versus $17,083 for females. The per capita income for the village was $11,361. About 32.2% of families and 28.8% of the population were below the poverty line, including 46.8% of those under the age of eighteen and none of those 65 or over.

Notable person

 George W. Swink, businessman

References

Villages in McDonough County, Illinois
Villages in Illinois